Her Jong-chau (born 5 January 1946) is a former Taiwanese cyclist. He competed in the individual road race and team time trial events at the 1964 Summer Olympics.

References

External links
 

1946 births
Living people
Taiwanese male cyclists
Olympic cyclists of Taiwan
Cyclists at the 1964 Summer Olympics
Place of birth missing (living people)